Kasparov's immortal is a chess game played by Garry Kasparov as White against Veselin Topalov as Black at the Hoogovens Wijk aan Zee Chess Tournament 1999 chess tournament.  This is one of Kasparov's most famous games; it is considered a masterpiece and Chess.com has listed it as the #1 chess game ever played.

The game

White: Kasparov  Black: Topalov  Opening: Pirc Defense (ECO B07)

1. e4 d6

An unusual response by Topalov to Kasparov's 1. e4, resulting in a position Kasparov never saw before in classical play.

2. d4 Nf6 3. Nc3 g6

This setup has similarities to the King's Indian Defence, but White's c pawn remains on the second rank.

4. Be3 Bg7 5. Qd2 c6 6. f3 b5 7. Nge2 Nbd7 8. Bh6 Bxh6 9. Qxh6

This queen capture hinders Black's castling.

9. … Bb7 10. a3 e5 11. O-O-O Qe7 12. Kb1 a6 13. Nc1 O-O-O 14. Nb3 exd4!

This opens Black's position.

15. Rxd4 c5 16. Rd1 Nb6 17. g3 Kb8 18. Na5 Ba8 19. Bh3 d5 20. Qf4+ Ka7 21. Rhe1 d4 22. Nd5?!

If Black plays 22. … Nfxd5?, White responds with 23. exd5 Qd6 24. Qxf7+ which leads to White being up a piece, e.g. 24. … Kb8 25. Re6 Qc7 26. Re7 Nd7 27. Nc6 Bxc6 28. dxc6 Qxc6 29. Bxd7.

22. … Nbxd5 23. exd5 Qd6 24. Rxd4!!

Now the fireworks start.

24. … cxd4

While Black would had been better off declining the rook sacrifice with Kb6!, the game would had been largely forgotten.

Black can not reply with Nxd5 because White could had then played Qxf7+.

25. Re7+ Kb6

If Qxe7??, then mate cannot be avoided: 26.Qxd4+ Kb8 27.Qb6+ Bb7 28.Nc6+ Ka8 29.Qa7#.

26. Qxd4+ Kxa5 27. b4+ Ka4 28. Qc3?!

Lubomir Kavalek, writing for The Washington Post, was the first one to observe that Ra7!! is a better attack for White in this position.

28. … Qxd5

Bxd5? is refuted with 29. Kb2 followed by Qb3+ which leads to White delivering checkmate.

29. Ra7 Bb7 30. Rxb7 Qc4!

Topalov, after the game, analyzed the position with his second Silvio Danailov for hours and told the press at the tournament that Black had drawing chances after 30. … Rhe8 31. Rb6 Ra8 32. Be6. However, Black is in trouble if White instead plays 32. Bf1!!.

31. Qxf6 Kxa3?!

Black had much better drawing chances with 31. … Rd1+! During the game, Kasparov visualizing this line saw White having a stronger endgame after 32. Kb2 Ra8 33. Qb6 Qd4+ 34. Qxd4 Rxd4 35. Rxf7 a5 36. Be6 axb4 37. Bb3+ Ka5 38. axb4+ Kb6 39. Rxh7 but realized, after the game was over, that Black could had fought for a draw with 39. … Rf8  Computer analysis shows no clear win for White after 39. … Rf8, but also shows White had better fighting chances after 35. Bd7 Rd6 36. g4 in a line very hard for humans to visualize.

32. Qxa6+ Kxb4 33. c3+ Kxc3 34. Qa1+ Kd2 35. Qb2+ Kd1

This is the position in the diagram at the top.

36. Bf1!! Rd2

If Black plays 36. … Qxf1? in this position, White can force mate: 37.Qc2+ Ke1 38.Re7+ Qe2 39.Qxe2#

If 36. … Qd5, 37.Qc1 mates.

37. Rd7!!

Pinning Black's rook so that White can capture Black's queen without losing his own.

37. … Rxd7 38. Bxc4 bxc4

If Black attempted to save his h8 rook, White would have won with Qc1#.

39. Qxh8 Rd3 40. Qa8 c3 41. Qa4+ Ke1 42. f4 f5 43. Kc1 Rd2 44. Qa7 1-0

As the game ended, Kasparov remembers the audience in the hall applauding.

References

External links
 Lichess analysis board of game
 Chessgames.com discussion of game
 This game, allegedly annotated by Kasparov
 NM A.J. Goldsby's analysis of this game
 Hikaru Nakamura's video analysis and praise of this game

Chess games
1999 in chess
Garry Kasparov